Víctor Campaz (born 21 May 1949) is a Colombian former footballer. He played in three matches for the Colombia national football team in 1975. He was also part of Colombia's squad for the 1975 Copa América tournament.

References

External links
 

1949 births
Living people
Colombian footballers
Colombia international footballers
Place of birth missing (living people)
Association football forwards
América de Cali footballers
Deportivo Pereira footballers
Independiente Santa Fe footballers
Atlético Nacional footballers
Atlético Junior footballers
Deportes Tolima footballers
Independiente Medellín footballers
Atlético Bucaramanga footballers
Estudiantes de Mérida players
Colombian expatriate footballers
Expatriate footballers in Venezuela